Cadorna is a surname. Notable people with the surname include:

Carlo Cadorna (1809–1891), Italian politician
Raffaele Cadorna (1815–1897), general of the Risorgimento, brother of Carlo
Raffaele Cadorna Jr. (1889–1973), leader of Italian partisans in World War II
Luigi Cadorna (1850–1928), field marshal in World War I

See also
Cadorna (Milan Metro), a subway station
Milano Cadorna railway station, a railway station
Piazzale Cadorna, a Milan, Italy, square
Cadorna, a subclass of the Italian Navy Condottieri class cruiser